Jan August Erlingmark (born 22 April 1998) is a Swedish professional footballer who plays as a midfielder for Super League Greece club Atromitos.

International career
Erlingmark made his debut for the Sweden national team in a friendly game against Kosovo on 12 January 2020.

Personal life
He is the son of former IFK Göteborg captain and national team player Magnus Erlingmark.

Honours
IFK Göteborg
Svenska Cupen: 2019–20

References

External links

Profile at IFK Göteborg

1998 births
Living people
IFK Göteborg players
Atromitos F.C. players
Swedish footballers
Swedish expatriate footballers
Swedish expatriate sportspeople in Greece
Expatriate footballers in Greece
Allsvenskan players
Super League Greece players
Footballers from Gothenburg
Association football midfielders
Sweden youth international footballers